The Cooper Companies, Inc., branded as CooperCompanies, is a global medical device company, publicly traded on the NYSE (NYSE:COO). With its headquarters in San Ramon, California, it has a workforce of more than 12,000 employees worldwide and consists of two business units, CooperVision (CVI) which manufactures contact lenses, and CooperSurgical (CSI) which manufactures medical devices and fertility and genomic products for the women’s health care market.

History
CooperCompanies was founded in 1958 as Martin H. Smith Co. and later incorporated as Cooper Tinsley Laboratories Inc. in 1961. The company changed its name to Cooper Laboratories Inc. in 1967. It entered the contact lens business in 1972 when it acquired British lens maker GlobalVision.

In 1980, Cooper Laboratories reorganized into three business groups: CooperVision, CooperCare and CooperBiomedical, with Cooper Medical Devices Corp. added as a fourth group one year later.

The company was renamed The Cooper Companies in 1987. Three years later, it was further restructured into three business units: CooperVision, CooperSurgical and CooperVision Pharmaceuticals. The latter was dissolved in 2003.

Today, the firm operates as two business units: CooperVision and CooperSurgical.

Albert G. White III was named President and CEO in May 2018. Holly Sheffield was name President of CooperSurgical effective July 2020.

Business units
CooperVision serves contact lens wearers and eye care practitioners. It was incorporated in 1980 and today is one of the world’s largest manufacturers of soft contact lenses. Its contact lenses and related products are sold in over 100 countries. Products include a range of daily, two-week and monthly disposable contact lenses, and other spherical, toric and multifocal lenses for astigmatism, nearsightedness and farsightedness, and presbyopia. In 2022, CooperVision acquired EnsEyers, a supplier of orthokeratology and scleral contact lenses.

CooperSurgical is the medical device and fertility and genomics unit of the companies. It became a business unit in 1990 and its focus includes women's health and fertility.

Acquisitions 
In February 2021, CooperSurgical acquired AEGEA Medical, a medical manufacturing company. In March 2021, the company acquired Safe Obstetric Systems. In December 2021, CooperSurgical acquired Generate Life Sciences for $1.6 billion.

In 2022, CooperSurgical purchased Cook Medical's reproductive health portfolio for $875 million.

See also 
 List of S&P 400 companies

References

External links

Companies listed on the New York Stock Exchange
American companies established in 1958
Health care companies established in 1958
1958 establishments in California
Health care companies based in California
Companies based in San Ramon, California
Medical technology companies of the United States
Medical device manufacturers